Foundation is an American science fiction streaming television series created by David S. Goyer and Josh Friedman for Apple TV+, loosely based on the Foundation series of stories by Isaac Asimov. It features an ensemble cast led by Jared Harris, Lee Pace, Lou Llobell and Leah Harvey. Foundation premiered on September 24, 2021. In October 2021, the series was renewed for a second season, which is set to premiere in mid-2023.

Premise 
Foundation chronicles "...the thousand-year saga of The Foundation, a band of exiles who discover that the only way to save the Galactic Empire from destruction is to defy it."

Cast and characters

Main 
 Jared Harris as Hari Seldon, a mathematician and developer of psychohistory, an algorithmic science that allows him to predict the future in terms of probabilities.
 Lee Pace as Brother Day (Cleon XII and XIII), the middle-aged member of a series of genetic clones of Cleon I who reigns as Emperor of the 12,000-year old Galactic Empire; Pace also portrays Cleon I in his prime.
 Lou Llobell as Gaal Dornick, Hari's protégée, a self-taught young woman from a planet where the pursuit of knowledge is considered heresy.
 Leah Harvey as Salvor Hardin, the Warden of Terminus 35 years after Seldon's trial, hero of the Foundation's first crisis and Gaal Dornick's daughter.
 Laura Birn as Eto Demerzel, majordomo to the Emperors and one of the last surviving androids from the ancient Robot Wars.
 Terrence Mann as Brother Dusk (Cleon XI and XII), the eldest member of a series of genetic clones of Cleon I who retired from his duties as Emperor; Mann also portrays an elderly Cleon I.
 Chipo Chung as the voice of the Deliverance operating system.
 Cassian Bilton as Brother Dawn (Cleon XIV), the youngest member of a series of genetic clones of Cleon I and the successor-in-training of Brother Day.

Recurring 
 Alfred Enoch as Raych Foss, the adopted son of Hari Seldon.
 Cooper Carter as the child Brother Dawn/Cleon XIII.
 Reece Shearsmith as Jerril, an Imperial agent during Cleon XII's reign.
 Clarke Peters as Abbas Hardin, a Seldon follower, the first Warden and first Mayor of Terminus, and surrogate father of Salvor Hardin.
 Sasha Behar as Mari Hardin, a Seldon follower and surrogate mother of Salvor Hardin.
 Daniel MacPherson as Hugo Crast, an interplanetary trader from Thespis who became Salvor Hardin's lover.
 Kubbra Sait as Grand Huntress Phara Keaen, the top military officer of Anacreon who personally leads a raid on Terminus.
 Elliot Cowan as Lewis Pirenne, the Director of the Foundation and first successor of Hari Seldon.
 Amy Tyger as Azura Odili, an Imperial Palace gardener and love interest of Brother Dawn/Cleon XIV.
 Mido Hamada as Shadow Master Obrecht, the Imperial spymaster during Cleon XIII's reign.
 Christian Contreras as Commander Dorwin, an Imperial soldier sent to investigate loss of contact with Terminus.
 T'Nia Miller as Zephyr Halima Ifa, a senior priestess of the Luminist faith vying to become its next leader.

Guest 
 Alexander Siddig as Advocate Xylas, the prosecutor in Seldon's trial.
 Ian McNeice as Master Statistician Tivole, the head of the Emperor's personal team of mathematicians.

Production

Development 
On June 27, 2017, it was reported that Skydance Television was developing a television series adaptation of Isaac Asimov's science fiction book series Foundation with David S. Goyer and Josh Friedman serving as the production's writers. At the time of the report, the production company was in the midst of closing a deal with Asimov's estate for the rights to the book series. On April 10, 2018, it was announced that Apple, through their Worldwide Video Unit, had bought the series and put it into development with the potential for a straight-to-series order. It was further announced that Goyer and Friedman were also expected to serve as executive producers and showrunners. Other executive producers announced included David Ellison, Dana Goldberg, and Marcy Ross.

On August 23, 2018, it was announced that Apple had given the production a series order for a first season consisting of ten episodes. It was also announced that Asimov's daughter, Robyn Asimov, would serve as an executive producer. On April 18, 2019, Josh Friedman left as co-writer and co-showrunner. On July 28, 2019, it was revealed that Troy Studios in Limerick, Ireland, would host production of the show. According to Screen Ireland the series would create more than 500 production jobs at the studio. Asimov's daughter, Robyn Asimov, provides familial assistance to the series. Goyer pitched the series in one sentence: "It’s a 1,000-year chess game between Hari Seldon and the Empire, and all the characters in between are the pawns, but some of the pawns over the course of this saga end up becoming kings and queens." On October 7, 2021, Apple TV+ renewed the series for a second season which is set to premiere in summer 2023.

Writing 
In January 2021, Goyer stated "with Foundation we can tell the story, hopefully, over the course of eighty episodes; eighty hours, as opposed to trying to condense it all into two or three hours for a single film". Goyer said that this format might not succeed, but if it did it would be unique. David S. Goyer and Josh Friedman were set as the production's writers; however, Friedman left as co-writer in April 2019. Goyer also noted that telling a story that took place over 1,000 years was something a film could not accomplish and would have been a harder story to tell in that format.

Casting 
Lee Pace and Jared Harris play Brother Day and Hari Seldon, respectively. Lou Llobell stars as Gaal, a mathematical genius from a rural, repressed planet. Leah Harvey as Salvor, the protective and intuitive warden of a remote outer planet. Laura Birn stars as Eto Demerzel, the enigmatic android aide to the Emperor of the Galaxy. Terrence Mann stars as Brother Dusk, the eldest living member of the ruling family. Cassian Bilton plays Brother Dawn, the youngest living member of the ruling family and next in line to be Brother Day. In a June 2021 trailer, Alfred Enoch was revealed as part of the cast. New characters Brother Day, Brother Dusk, and Brother Dawn are original characters created for the series. Each is a different-aged clone in the "genetic dynasty" of the Emperor Cleon I: the youngest clone is called Dawn, the middle clone and reigning emperor is called Day, and the emperor emeritus is called Dusk. For season 2, Isabella Laughland was cast as Brother Constant along with Sandra Yi Sencindiver, Ella-Rae Smith, Dimitri Leonidas, Ben Daniels, Holt McCallany, Mikael Persbrandt, Rachel House, and Nimrat Kaur.

Filming 
On March 12, 2020, Apple suspended production of the show in Ireland due to the COVID-19 pandemic. On October 6, filming was resumed. On January 27, 2021, Goyer announced that after quarantining and receiving special waivers from the government of Malta, cast and crew members were allowed to start filming on the island. Goyer noted, filming was always planned to be conducted in Malta; however, due to new restrictions imposed in London, they moved significant portions of production to Malta. Filming in Malta concluded in February 2021. Filming in Tuineje, Fuerteventura (Canary Islands) was already wrapped by March 2021. The production team worked in volcanic landscapes such as the Caldera de los Arrabales and Granja de Pozo Negro. The production team then moved to Tenerife, where filming resumed on March 22, 2021. Filming concluded in April 2021 after 19 months.

The second season began filming in Prague, Czech Republic on April 11, 2022.

Episodes

Season 1 (2021)

Season 2
The first through tenth episodes were written by David S. Goyer & Jane Espenson, Jane Espenson & David S. Goyer, Leigh Dana Jackson & Jane Espenson, Leigh Dana Jackson & David S. Goyer, Joelle Cornett & Jane Espenson, David S. Goyer & Jane Espenson, Eric Carrasco & David Kob, Liz Phang & Addie Roy Manis & Bob Oltra, Jane Espenson & Eric Carrasco, and David S. Goyer & Liz Phang, respectively.

Release 
On June 22, 2020, as part of its Worldwide Developers Conference, Apple released a teaser trailer for the series. In February 2021, it was reported that the series would premiere in late 2021. In June 2021, Apple announced that Foundation would premiere in September 2021. Later that month, Apple released a second official trailer and confirmed the premiere date as September 24, 2021. The series premiered with a two-episode release, with the remaining eight episodes scheduled to be released weekly.

Reception 
The review aggregator website Rotten Tomatoes reports a 71% approval rating with an average rating of 7/10, based on 86 reviews for the first season.  The website's critical consensus reads, "Foundation big-budget production and impressive performances are a sight to behold, but it struggles to wrangle the behemoth that is its source material into a fully satisfying series." Metacritic gave the first season a weighted average score of 62 out of 100 based on 25 reviews, indicating "generally favorable reviews".

Nick Allen of RogerEbert.com considers Foundation to be "the type of sci-fi series that truly warrants being called an event", a "grandiose sci-fi with limits". He writes that the show is "huge in numerous senses", praising its world building as "always impressive with its grandeur that's both practical and also created with IMAX-worthy special effects". He points to the show's ability at holding viewers' attention as "the show sucks you in a great deal", and notes that "Foundation creates a strong rhythm of being able to juggle so many different storylines". Allen admired "promise of visual grandiosity" and "magic we’re more used to praising expensive films for", highlighting everything from "the intricate lighting of a space craft" and "incredible costume design", to "incredible" real locations with massive sets that "makes a visceral difference when a setting is clearly only using green screen and special effects to enhance the work". He also praised Bear McCreary's score as "essential and so effective in making certain story developments seem larger than life". Allen also noted how performances offer "a wide range", whose "dynamic becomes one of (show's) most interesting facets", while highlighting Lee Pace's performance as "magnetic". He concludes that the show has a potential to "become another landmark series for Apple TV+", and that its best feature actually is that "it’s not for everyone" because "it's fairly set in its pacing that favors heady, dense character building" that will favor subscribers "hungry to enter new sci-fi worlds not just for the action".

Film reviewer Rob Bricken of Gizmodo was less impressed with the series, suggesting that it could be much better, and stating "Honestly, after most of the second episode, the show and the books are pretty much unrecognizable", as well as that the original source material of Foundation may not be filmable after all.

The Verges Chaim Gartenberg and Andrew Webster weighed in at the end of Season 1, with Gartenberg opining "the 'genetic dynasty' of a succession of Lee Pace's ruling the crumbling empire with an iron fist is the show's highlight, thanks in no small part to Pace's dynamic performances as the cloned Brother Day. And Salvor Hardin's cat-and-mouse game on Terminus with the Anacreons is enjoyable sci-fi fare, too. Meanwhile, the third leg of the story, the prolonged drama of Gaal's shuttling in cryo from place to place as the show hints at her mysterious powers, is... less compelling" and Webster stating that "once all of the initial worldbuilding and discussion of future-predicting math was out of the way in the first few episodes, Foundation really picked up in a lot of ways. The worldbuilding remains incredible throughout. All of the many cultures and planets have a depth to them that is quite frankly astounding."

Accolades

References

External links
 
 

2020s American drama television series
2020s American science fiction television series
2021 American television series debuts
English-language television shows
Apple TV+ original programming
Foundation universe
Television series created by David S. Goyer
Television shows based on American novels
Television productions suspended due to the COVID-19 pandemic
Television shows filmed in the Republic of Ireland
Television shows filmed in the Czech Republic
Television shows filmed in Malta
Television shows filmed in Spain
Television series by Skydance Television